The Carplane GmbH Carplane is a German roadable aircraft under development by Carplane GmbH of Braunschweig. The aircraft is intended to be supplied complete and ready-to-fly.

The nearly complete prototype was first shown at the AERO Friedrichshafen show in 2015.

Design and development
The design is intended to be certified as an EASA CS-VLA Very Light Aircraft under EASA airworthiness rules. It may also be put in the US light-sport aircraft category under a weight exemption.

The Carplane features a folding cantilever high-wing, two individual single-seat enclosed cockpits in side-by-side configuration in separate fuselages with individual bubble canopies. It has fixed quadracycle landing gear with  wheels and a single engine in pusher configuration.

The twin fuselage design is intended to produce a vehicle that will drive as well as any compact car, while allowing space for the wings to fold and to store between the two fuselages, thus improving road aerodynamics and lower centre of gravity.

The aircraft is made from composites. The standard engine used is a  LSA-Engines LSA850-130 gasoline two-cylinder four-stroke  powerplant.

Funding for the development is being provided by the European Union and the German state of Lower Saxony.

Specifications

References

External links

Carplane
2010s German ultralight aircraft
Single-engined pusher aircraft
Roadable aircraft